Kahusaari may refer to:

 Karhusaari, a district on the eastern side of Helsinki
 Karhusaari (island), an island on the western edge of Helsinki